USS Jones may refer to various United States Navy ships:

, a brig launched in 1814 and sold in 1821
USS Bessie Jones (SP-1476) Maryland State Oyster Police Force schooner in Navy service 1917-1919 
, a destroyer escort commissioned in 1959 and stricken in 1974
, an armed sidewheel ferry purchased in 1863 and sunk in 1864
, a destroyer in commission from 1940 to 1947
, the name of more than one ship
, the name of more than one ship
, the name of more than one ship
, a steam launch launched in 1863 and sold in 1865
, a destroyer in commission from 1920 to 1930

United States Navy ship names